Grant Shiells (born 23 September 1989 in Melrose, Scottish Borders) is a rugby union player for Edinburgh in the Pro14. Formerly a player at Newcastle Falcons in the Aviva Premiership, he plays as a loosehead prop.

References

External links

1989 births
Living people
Rugby union players from Melrose, Scottish Borders
Scottish rugby union players
People educated at Kelso High School, Scotland
Scotland 'A' international rugby union players
Rugby union props